Frequency-hopping spread spectrum (FHSS) is a method of transmitting radio signals by rapidly changing the carrier frequency among many frequencies occupying a large spectral band. The changes are controlled by a code known to both transmitter and receiver. FHSS is used to avoid interference, to prevent eavesdropping, and to enable code-division multiple access (CDMA) communications.

The frequency band is divided into smaller sub-bands. Signals rapidly change ("hop") their carrier frequencies among the center frequencies of these sub-bands in a determined order. Interference at a specific frequency will affect the signal only during a short interval.

FHSS offers four main advantages over a fixed-frequency transmission:

 FHSS signals are highly resistant to narrowband interference because the signal hops to a different frequency band.
 Signals are difficult to intercept if the frequency-hopping pattern is not known.
 Jamming is also difficult if the pattern is unknown; the signal can be jammed only for a single hopping period if the spreading sequence is unknown.
 FHSS transmissions can share a frequency band with many types of conventional transmissions with minimal mutual interference. FHSS signals add minimal interference to narrowband communications, and vice versa.

Usage

Military 
Spread-spectrum signals are highly resistant to deliberate jamming unless the adversary has knowledge of the frequency-hopping pattern. Military radios generate the frequency-hopping pattern under the control of a secret Transmission Security Key (TRANSEC) that the sender and receiver share in advance. This key is generated by devices such as the KY-57 Speech Security Equipment. United States military radios that use frequency hopping include the JTIDS/MIDS family, the HAVE QUICK Aeronautical Mobile communications system, and the SINCGARS Combat Net Radio, Link-16.

Civilian 
In the US, since the Federal Communications Commission (FCC) amended rules to allow FHSS systems in the unregulated 2.4 GHz band, many consumer devices in that band have employed various FHSS modes. eFCC CFR 47 part 15.247 covers the regulations in the US for  902–928 MHz, 2400–2483.5 MHz, and 5725–5850 MHz bands, and the requirements for frequency hopping.

Some walkie-talkies that employ FHSS technology have been developed for unlicensed use on the 900 MHz band. FHSS technology is also used in many hobby transmitters and receivers used for radio-controlled model cars, airplanes, and drones. A type of multiple access is achieved allowing hundreds of transmitter/receiver pairs to be operated simultaneously on the same band, in contrast to previous FM or AM radio-controlled systems that had limited simultaneous channels.

Technical considerations
The overall bandwidth required for frequency hopping is much wider than that required to transmit the same information using only one carrier frequency. But because transmission occurs only on a small portion of this bandwidth at any given time, the instantaneous interference bandwidth is really the same. While providing no extra protection against wideband thermal noise, the frequency-hopping approach reduces the degradation caused by narrowband interference sources.

One of the challenges of frequency-hopping systems is to synchronize the transmitter and receiver. One approach is to have a guarantee that the transmitter will use all the channels in a fixed period of time. The receiver can then find the transmitter by picking a random channel and listening for valid data on that channel. The transmitter's data is identified by a special sequence of data that is unlikely to occur over the segment of data for this channel, and the segment can also have a checksum for integrity checking and further identification. The transmitter and receiver can use fixed tables of frequency-hopping patterns, so that once synchronized they can maintain communication by following the table.

In the US, FCC part 15 on unlicensed spread spectrum systems in the 902–928 MHz and 2.4 GHz bands permits more power than is allowed for non-spread-spectrum systems. Both FHSS and direct-sequence spread-spectrum (DSSS) systems can transmit at 1 watt, a thousandfold increase from the 1 milliwatt limit on non-spread-spectrum systems. The FCC also prescribes a minimum number of frequency channels and a maximum dwell time for each channel.

Origins
In 1899 Guglielmo Marconi experimented with frequency-selective reception in an attempt to minimise interference.

The earliest mentions of frequency hopping in open literature are in US patent 725,605, awarded to Nikola Tesla on March 17, 1903, and in radio pioneer Jonathan Zenneck's book Wireless Telegraphy (German, 1908, English translation McGraw Hill, 1915), although Zenneck writes that Telefunken had already tried it. Nikola Tesla doesn't mention the phrase "frequency hopping" directly, but certainly alludes to it. Entitled Method of Signaling, the patent describes a system that would enable radio communication without any danger of the signals or messages being disturbed, intercepted, interfered with in any way.

The German military made limited use of frequency hopping for communication between fixed command points in World War I to prevent eavesdropping by British forces, who did not have the technology to follow the sequence. Jonathan Zenneck's book Wireless Telegraphy was originally published in German in 1908, but was translated into English in 1915 as the enemy started using frequency hopping on the front line. Zenneck was a German physicist and electrical engineer who had become interested in radio by attending Tesla's lectures on "wireless sciences". Wireless Telegraphy includes a section on frequency hopping, and, as it became a standard text for many years, it probably introduced the technology to a generation of engineers.

A Polish engineer and inventor, Leonard Danilewicz, came up with the idea in 1929. Several other patents were taken out in the 1930s, including one by Willem Broertjes (issued Aug. 2, 1932).

During World War II, the US Army Signal Corps was inventing a communication system called SIGSALY, which incorporated spread spectrum in a single frequency context. But SIGSALY was a top-secret communications system, so its existence was not known until the 1980s.

In 1942, actress Hedy Lamarr and composer George Antheil received  for their "Secret Communications System", an early version of frequency hopping using a piano-roll to switch among 88 frequencies to make radio-guided torpedoes harder for enemies to detect or jam. The U.S. Navy rejected the idea, then seized it as "alien property" in 1942 (Lamarr was Austrian) but filed it away with no record of a working device being produced. Lamarr's and Antheil's idea was rediscovered in the 1950s during patent searches when private companies were independently developing direct-sequence Code Division Multiple Access, a non-frequency-hopping form of spread-spectrum, and has been cited numerous times since. In 1957, engineers at Sylvania Electronic Systems Division adopted the patented concept, combined with the recently invented transistor. In 1962, the US Navy finally utilized the technology during the Cuban Missile Crisis; Lamarr's and Antheil's patent had expired.

A practical application of frequency hopping was developed by Ray Zinn, co-founder of Micrel Corporation. Zinn developed a method allowing radio devices to operate without the need to synchronize a receiver with a transmitter. Using frequency hopping and sweep modes, Zinn's method is primarily applied in low data rate wireless applications such as utility metering, machine and equipment monitoring and metering, and remote control. In 2006 Zinn received  for his "Wireless device and method using frequency hopping and sweep modes."

Variations 
Adaptive frequency-hopping spread spectrum (AFH) as used in Bluetooth improves resistance to radio frequency interference by avoiding crowded frequencies in the hopping sequence. This sort of adaptive transmission is easier to implement with FHSS than with DSSS.

The key idea behind AFH is to use only the "good" frequencies and avoid the "bad" ones—those experiencing frequency selective fading, those on which a third party is trying to communicate, or those being actively jammed. Therefore, AFH should be complemented by a mechanism for detecting good and bad channels.

But if the radio frequency interference is itself dynamic, then AFH's strategy of "bad channel removal" may not work well. For example, if there are several colocated frequency-hopping networks (as Bluetooth Piconet), they are mutually interfering and AFH's strategy fails to avoid this interference.

The problem of dynamic interference, gradual reduction of available hopping channels and backward compatibility with legacy Bluetooth devices was resolved in version 1.2 of the Bluetooth Standard (2003). Such a situation can often happen in the scenarios that use unlicensed spectrum.

In addition, dynamic radio frequency interference is expected to occur in the scenarios related to cognitive radio, where the networks and the devices should exhibit frequency-agile operation.

Chirp modulation can be seen as a form of frequency-hopping that simply scans through the available frequencies in consecutive order to communicate.

Frequency hopping can be superimposed on other modulations or waveforms to enhance the system performance.

See also
 Dynamic frequency hopping
 List of multiple discoveries
 Maximum length sequence
 Orthogonal frequency-division multiplexing
 Radio frequency sweep

Notes

References

Bibliography
 Władysław Kozaczuk, Enigma: How the German Machine Cipher Was Broken, and How It Was Read by the Allies in World War Two, edited and translated by Christopher Kasparek, Frederick, MD, University Publications of America, 1984, .

Multiplexing
Quantized radio modulation modes
Radio frequency propagation
Radio resource management
Military radio systems

ja:スペクトラム拡散#周波数ホッピング